Olatunji Bello (born 1 July 1961) is a lawyer, environmentalist, political scientist, journalist and the sitting Commissioner for Environment and Water Resources under the Babajide Sanwo-Olu Administration in Lagos State. He is a Lagosian.

Educational background 
He  has a B.Sc. Degree from the University of Ibadan where he studied Political Science and graduated in 1984. He earned his Masters Degree in International Law and Diplomacy ML.D in (1987) from the  University of Lagos. He had earned a Bachelor of Laws degree from the same University of Lagos, Nigeria, in the year 2000.

Media career 
Tunji Bello started his media career at the defunct Concord Press of Nigeria where he grew to become an Editor.He started out as a Features Writer; was also an Assistant Features Editor. His career in journalism grew so quickly that he became a Politics Editor at the age of 27. He was later promoted to the Editor of the Sunday title and later Editor of the daily title of the Concord Newspapers Group. He was also appointed Chairman of the Editorial Board of THISDAY Newspaper. He was a Staff Writer with St. Petersburg Times, Florida, USA, and the US News & World Report, Washington DC in 1992.

Political career 
As a student at the University of Ibadan, Tunji Bello was Vice President of the University of Ibadan Students Union. He had always agitated for democracy since the 80s. His mainstream national political career started when he served as the Special Assistant to Bashorun MKO Abiola, winner of the annulled June 12, 1993 Presidential election. After the annulment of the epochal election, Tunji Bello became a member of the Nigerian pro-democracy group, NADECO which fought for the actualisation of Democracy in Nigeria which was on from 1993 to 1999. After the handing over from the Military rule to the Democratic dispensation in 1999, Tunji Bello joined the former Governor of Lagos State, Asiwaju Bola Ahmeed Tinubu in his cabinet. He served as the Head of Signage and Advertising Agency (LASSA) and also the Commissioner for Environment in the Asiwaju administration

In July 2011, he joined the Governor Babatunde Fashola’s administration and he was sworn in by the Governor  as Commissioner for Environment where he served till May 29, 2015.

In 2015, after the swearing in of the former Governor, Mr. Akinwunmi Ambode, Tunji Bello was appointed Secretary to the State Government on the 29th May 2015 serving till the end of Mr. Akinwunmi Ambode’s administration in 2019. 

In 2019, He joined the Sanwo-Olu administration and he was sworn in by the Governor in 2019 as the Commissioner for Environment and Water Resources and he is still in service.

Awards 
He received different awards. He received the  Alfred Friendly Press Fellowship, USA, He won the Concord Press award for Excellence and Bravery in Journalism, Concord Publisher’s Best Editorial Manager.  He was a recipient of the University of Ibadan Distinguished Alumnus Award and the University of Lagos Distinguished Alumni Achievers Award Of Excellence.  He was honoured by Nigerian Society of Engineers, Ikeja, Lagos branch, and the UNDP for laying the foundation for environmental sustenance in Lagos state. He has authored one book and contributed to four others.

Personal life 

He is the husband of Ibiyemi Olatunji-Bello, the current Vice-Chancellor of Lagos State University since September 2021.

References

1961 births
Living people
Place of birth missing (living people)
University of Ibadan alumni
University of Lagos alumni
Nigerian Law School alumni
20th-century Nigerian lawyers
Nigerian environmentalists
Nigerian political scientists
Nigerian journalists
21st-century Nigerian lawyers